Golden Delicious is a cultivar of apple. It is one of the 15 most popular apple cultivars in the United States.  It is not closely related to Red Delicious.

History 
Golden Delicious arose from a chance seedling, possibly a hybrid of Grimes Golden and Golden Reinette. The original tree was found on the family farm of J. M. Mullins in Clay County, West Virginia, and was locally known as Mullins' Yellow Seedling. Mullins sold the tree and propagation rights to Stark Brothers Nurseries for $5000, which first marketed it as a companion of their Red Delicious in 1914.

In 1943, the New York State Agricultural Experiment Station in Geneva, New York developed the Jonagold apple by cross-breeding Golden Delicious and Jonathan trees. The cultivar was officially released in 1968 and went on to become the leading apple cultivar in Europe. According to the US Apple Association website, Golden Delicious, along with its descendent cultivars Gala, Ginger Gold, Honeycrisp, and Jonagold, were among the fifteen most popular apple cultivars in the United States.

Golden Delicious was designated the official state fruit of West Virginia by a Senate resolution on February 20, 1995. Clay County has hosted an annual Golden Delicious Festival since 1972.

In 2010, an Italian-led consortium announced they had decoded the complete genome of the Golden Delicious apple. It had the highest number of genes (57,000) of any plant genome studied to date.

Golden Delicious was one of four apples honored by the United States Postal Service in a 2013 set of four 33¢ stamps commemorating historic strains, joined by Northern Spy, Baldwin, and Granny Smith.

Appearance and flavor 

Golden Delicious is a large, yellowish-green skinned cultivar and very sweet to the taste. It is prone to bruising and shriveling, so it needs careful handling and storage. It is a favorite for eating plain, as well as for use in salads, apple sauce, and apple butter. America's Test Kitchen, Food Network, and Serious Eats all list Golden Delicious apples as one of the best apples for baking apple pie due to its balanced flavor and its high pectin content that allows it to stay intact when cooked.

Season 

Golden Delicious are harvested from fall through winter.

Descendant cultivars 
 Akita Gold (Golden Delicious × Fuji)
 Ambrosia (believed to be Starking Delicious × Golden Delicious)
 Arlet (Golden Delicious × Idared)
 Autumn Glory (Golden Delicious x Fuji)
 Bohemia (Lord Lambourne × Golden Delicious)
 Cadel (Jonathan × Golden Delicious)
 Cameo (Golden Delicious × Red Delicious)
 Caudle (Golden Delicious × Red Delicious)
 Champion (Golden Delicious × Cox Orange)
 Chantecler (Golden Delicious × Reinette Clochard)
 Delbarestivale (Golden Delicious × Stark Jonagrimes)
 Elstar (Ingrid Marie × Golden Delicious)
 Firm Gold (Starkspur Golden Delicious, U.S. PP 2024 × Starkrimson Red Delicious, U.S. PP 1565)
 Gala (Kidds Orange × Golden Delicious)
 Ginger Gold (Albemarle Pippin × Golden Delicious)
 Goldspur a Golden Delicious-like cultivar from Holland which is spur bearing
 Honeycrisp (MN1627 [Golden Delicious × Duchess of Oldenburg] × Keepsake [Frostbite (MN447) x Northern Spy])
 Iduna (Golden Delicious × Glockenapfel)
 Jonagold (Golden Delicious × Jonathan)
 Lucky Rose Golden A patented Golden Delicious mutant
 Maigold (Fraurotacher × Golden Delicious)
 Mutsu (apple) (Indo apple × Golden Delicious)
 Opal (apple) (Topaz × Golden Delicious)
 Pinova (Clivia × Golden Delicious)
 Rubinette (Golden Delicious × Cox Orange) 
 Sekai Ichi (Golden Delicious × Red Delicious)
 Spigold (Northern Spy × Golden Delicious)
 Sundowner (Golden Delicious × Lady Williams)
 Tentation delblush (Grifer' (Blushing Golden) × Golden Delicious)

References

External links 

 Overview of various apple cultivars
 A cook's overview of various apple cultivars
 Golden Delicious apple, in What Am I Eating? A Food Dictionary

American apples
Apple cultivars
Cuisine of West Virginia
Symbols of West Virginia
Trees of the Northeastern United States